The 2021 Cambridge City Council election took place on 6 May 2021 to elect members of Cambridge City Council in England. This was on the same day as other nationwide local elections.

Results summary

Ward results

Percentages are calculated by dividing the total number of votes by the number of seats available, then dividing the total each candidate received by that number, and multiplied by one-hundred.

Abbey

Arbury

Castle

Cherry Hinton

Coleridge

East Chesterton

King's Hedges

Market

Newnham

Petersfield

Queen Edith's

Romsey

Trumpington

West Chesterton

References

Cambridge
2021
2020s in Cambridge